Kalwakurthy is a city and revenue division in Nagarkurnool district of Telangana, India. It is the second largest town in Nagarkurnool district after Nagarkurnool by area.And also it is one of the major cities  in combined mahbubunagar district.It is located 80 km from Hyderabad on the Srisailam highway as well as on the Kodada to Jadcherla highway. It is around 31.7 km from the district headquarters of Nagarkurnool.

Demographics 
According to The Imperial Gazetteer of India, Kalvakurti was a taluk in Mahbubnagar district, Hyderabad State. It contained 101 villages with an area of 583 square miles. The population in 1901 was 54,384 compared with 52,132 in 1891. The headquarters Kalwakurthy had a population of 2,230.

Kalwakurthy town has population of 25,146 with 13,126 men and 12,020 women as per 2001 Census.

Villages in Kalwakurthy Mandal

Kalwakurthy Mandal data as per Census 2011 Year 

Total Rural Population 64,095

Total Urban Population 36,035

Politics 

Hyderabad state First elected Chief Minister Burgula Ramakrishna Rao was born in Padakallu village of Kalwakurthy Taluka. Current MLA is Jaipal Yadav. In Kalwakurthy, there are a various number of educational institutions and other facilities which are not common in other towns of similar category. Dr Chetamoni Pradeep Chandra Yadav alias agni is from this place.

ZPTC member

Transport 
The National Highway 765 passes through the village, which connects Hyderabad and Tokapalle road of Andhra Pradesh. National Highway 167 also passes through the mid of the town which connects between Kodad and Jadcherla.

Kalwakurthy is located just 70 kilometres from Rajiv Gandhi International Airport, Hyderabad.

Kalwakurthy has TSRTC bus depot which runs various types of buses to different places like Hyderabad, Mahabubnagar, Nagarkurnool, Srisailam, Guntur, Vijayawada etc..

References 

Mandals in Nagarkurnool district
Nagarkurnool district